Desafío is a compilation album released by New Era Entertainment in 2003. It consists of 25 tracks featuring such reggaeton artists as Ivy Queen, Don Omar, Alexis & Fido, Wisin & Yandel, and Tego Calderón, among others.

Track listing

Charts

References

2003 compilation albums
Albums produced by Ivy Queen
Albums produced by Luny Tunes
Albums produced by Noriega
Reggaeton compilation albums